Rudolf Seidl (28 November 1897 – 1940) was an Austrian footballer. He played in eight matches for the Austria national football team from 1920 to 1928.

References

External links
 

1897 births
1940 deaths
Austrian footballers
Austria international footballers
Place of birth missing
Association footballers not categorized by position
Austrian football managers
Floridsdorfer AC managers